Teddy Joe Faust, Sr. (born September 13, 1940) is an American politician. He is a member of the Alabama House of Representatives from the 94th District, serving since 2002. He is a member of the Republican party. He is a resident of Fairhope, Alabama and a graduate of Faulkner State Community College (1968).

References

Living people
Republican Party members of the Alabama House of Representatives
1940 births
Politicians from Birmingham, Alabama
People from Fairhope, Alabama
Faulkner State Community College alumni
21st-century American politicians